is a sub-kilometer asteroid, classified as near-Earth object and potentially hazardous asteroid of the Apollo group.

Description 

It was discovered by the Lowell Observatory Near-Earth-Object Search at Anderson Mesa Station on 20 November 2001, The potentially hazardous asteroid was removed from the Sentry Risk Table on 30 January 2002.

There are precovery images dating back to 10 February 1996. The orbit is well determined with an observation arc of 14.9 years which includes two radar delay observations. It has an Uncertainty Parameter of 0.

The asteroid will pass  from the Earth on 26 June 2028. During the close approach, the asteroid should peak at about apparent magnitude 6.7, and will be visible in binoculars. It has an absolute magnitude (H) of 18.2.

According to observations by the NEOWISE mission, the asteroid measures approximately 0.9 km in diameter and its surface has a rather low albedo of 0.097.

References

External links 
 Sormano Astronomical Observatory: Close encounter between Asteroid (153814) 2001 WN5 and Earth, diagrams and orbit evolution
 
 
 

153814
153814
153814
153814
20011120